Sri Tyagaraja is a rāgam in Carnatic music(musical scale of South Indian classical music) created by music composer  who has created many ragas, Which is named after saint Tyagaraja of Tiruvaiyaru. It is the Janya raga of 59th Melakarta rāgam Dharmavati in the 72 melakarta rāgam system of Carnatic classical music. Mahesh Mahadev introduced this raga to Indian classical music by composing Carnatic kritis & viruttams.

Sri Tyagaraja raga is an asymmetrical and does not contain dhaivatham in both ascending and descending of the scale, The gamakas of this raga emotes bhakti and karuna rasa.

Mahesh Mahadev has also introduced this new rāgam to Hindustani music.

Structure and Lakshana 

Sri Tyagaraja is an asymmetric rāgam that does not contain rishabham or dhaivatam in the ascending scale and does not contain dhaivatam in the descending scale. It is an audava-shadava rāgam (or owdava rāgam, meaning pentatonic ascending scale, shadava meaning hexatonic descending scale).

Its  structure (ascending and descending scale) is as follows.

 : 
 : 

The notes used in this scale are shadjam, sadharana gandharam, prati madhyamam, panchamam and kakali nishadham in ascending scale and chatushruti rishabham added in descending scale. It is a audava - shadava rāgam

Notes

Compositions 
The compositions in this rāgam

See also
List of Film Songs based on Ragas

References 

Janya ragas